Soyuz MS-02 was a 2016 Soyuz spaceflight that was planned for a 23 September 2016 launch, but because of technical difficulties it launched on 19 October 2016. It transported three members of the Expedition 49 crew to orbit and docked with the International Space Station. Soyuz MS-02 was the 131st flight of a Soyuz spacecraft. The crew consisted of a Russian commander and flight engineer, as well as an American flight engineer. Soyuz MS-02 docked with Poisk (MRM-2) module on 21 October 2016.

Soyuz MS-02 returned to Earth on 10 April 2017. During its descent, the capsule was partially depressurized when the main parachute deployed. The landing occurred at 11:20 UTC. The total flight duration was 173 days.

Partial depressurization 
During the final stage of its descent, Soyuz MS-02 suffered a partial depressurization about eight kilometers above the ground. When the main parachute was deployed, a buckle that was part of the deployment system struck a welding seam, partially depressurizing the capsule. The depressurization did not put the crew in danger as they were at a relatively safe height within the atmosphere when it occurred. Russian officials believe that the way the parachute was packed caused the buckle to strike the capsule.

Crew

Backup crew

References 

Crewed Soyuz missions
Spacecraft launched in 2016
2016 in Russia
Spacecraft which reentered in 2017
Spacecraft launched by Soyuz-FG rockets